Shelter Rock is a rock shelter of granite on the border of Manhasset and North Hills, New York, USA, 10 feet (3m) from Shelter Rock Road. The rock is a glacial erratic estimated to weigh 1,800 tons and has a 30-foot overhang. It is 55 feet high and 35 feet wide. It was deposited by glacial action between 20,000 and 11,000 years ago. Members of the Matinecock had a settlement nearby and a number of legends about the rock arose among both the Native Americans and the European colonists. Native Americans used the rock as shelter from the elements, possibly as early as 1000 B.C.

The boulder is located on Greentree, a private estate once owned by the Whitneys. The top of the boulder is just visible from Shelter Rock Road, more so in the colder parts of the year when the vegetation recedes. While it is not publicly accessible, the Greentree Foundation does arrange special tours for scouts, school and other small groups from time to time.

References

External links
Shelter Rock - Article by The Suffolk Gem & Mineral Club
North Hills, New York
Landforms of Nassau County, New York
Glacial erratics of New York (state)
Manhasset, New York
Rock shelters in the United States